Jan-Mikael Lindström (born 1944) is a retired Swedish diplomat, serving as the Ambassador of Sweden to China and Mongolia from 2006 to 2010. Previous postings include:

 2002-2006 Swedish Ambassador to Japan
 2000-2002 Chief Co-ordinator for Trade and Investment Promotion, Ministry for Foreign Affairs, in Stockholm.
 1998-2000 Head of the Trade Minister's office (rank of Ambassador), Stockholm
 1994-1998 Swedish Ambassador to Indonesia
 1990-1994 Minister Plenipotentiary and Uruguay Round negotiator, Swedish Delegation to the International Organisations in Geneva
 1989-1990 Deputy Head of Department for Multilateral Trade Affairs, Swedish Ministry for Foreign Affairs, Stockholm

Prior to 1989 he had postings with the Swedish Ministry for Foreign Affairs in Washington DC, Paris and Rabat.

Mikael Lindström was born in the Municipality of Solna outside Stockholm on 20 August 1944 to Monica Lindström (deceased in 2007) and Jan-Gunnar Lindström (deceased in 1969). He is married to Kerstin Lindström (née Davidson) and has three children.

He studied at Uppsala University, Sweden, receiving a degree in law in 1967 and one in economics and political science in 1970. In 1968-1969 he was a Ford Foundation fellow in international law, a Fulbright scholar and received an LL.M. degree from Northwestern University Law School, Chicago, USA.

2011-2020 Lindstrom was a senior advisor to Huawei Sweden. Mikael Lindstrom is currently a senior advisor with the business consultancy Six Year Plan AB. He is also chairman of Sweden Asia Consulting AB.

External links 
 Profile on the Swedish Foreign Ministry website
 Profile on the Embassy of Sweden, Beijing website

1944 births
Living people
Ambassadors of Sweden to Japan
Ambassadors of Sweden to Indonesia
Ambassadors of Sweden to China
Ambassadors of Sweden to Mongolia
Uppsala University alumni
Northwestern University Pritzker School of Law alumni